Little Redfish Lake is a name given to two different alpine lakes in central Idaho, both in the Sawtooth National Recreation Area and Custer County.  This article refers to the lake on Redfish Lake Creek downstream of Redfish Lake and south of Stanley.  For the article on the other Little Redfish Lake see Little Redfish Lake (White Cloud Mountains).

Little Redfish Lake is a picturesque mountain lake (photo) on the northeast edge of the Sawtooth mountain range in central Idaho, five miles south of Stanley in and less than mile from State Highway 75.

Both were named for the red-scaled sockeye salmon that returned every year to spawn via the Salmon River. The lakes flow into the river via Redfish Lake Creek.

Besides the red-scaled salmon that come to this lake, Little Redfish Lake also has a clay pit, located at the bottom of the lake.

In 1961, Richard Brautigan wrote portions of his novella Trout Fishing in America while camping near the lake, which is featured in several chapters of the book.

See also

 List of lakes in Idaho

References

External links

 Sawtooth National Forest - Redfish Lake Recreation Complex

Lakes of Idaho
Lakes of Custer County, Idaho
Glacial lakes of the United States
Glacial lakes of the Sawtooth National Forest